Philopator is a genus of moths belonging to the family Zygaenidae.

Species
Species:

Philopator basimaculata 
Philopator flavofasciata 
Philopator rotunda

References

Zygaenidae
Zygaenidae genera